Ikkitousen Deathmatch Survivor is a professional wrestling round-robin hardcore tournament biennially held by Big Japan Pro Wrestling (BJW) to determine the best wrestler of BJW's deathmatch division. The tournament was first held in 2011. From 2011 to 2013, one top wrestler from each block qualified for the final round with the two facing in the final but the format was changed in 2015 when top two wrestlers from each block qualified for the knockout stage. An alternative tournament is held for the strong style division called Ikkitousen Strong Climb since 2012.

List of winners

2011
The 2011 Ikkitousen Deathmatch Survivor was held between February 6 and April 18, 2011.

2013
The 2013 Ikkitousen Deathmatch Survivor was held between March 4 and April 10, 2013. The tournament final between Ryuji Ito and Isami Kodaka was a two out of three falls match, with the first fall being a Tables, Ladders and Chairs Death match, the second fall was a Fluorescent Lighttubes and Block Death Match and the third fall was a Nail Board, TLC, Fluorescent Lighttubes and Block Death match.

2015
The 2015 Ikkitousen Deathmatch Survivor was held between March 1 and April 19, 2015.

2017
The 2017 Ikkitousen Deathmatch Survivor was held between March 5 and April 8, 2017.

2019 
The 2019 Ikkitousen Deathmatch Survivor was held between February 28 to March 31.

2021 
The 2021 Ikkitousen Deathmatch Survivor was held between March 3 to June 28.

See also
Ikkitousen Strong Climb
Saikyo Tag League
List of Big Japan Pro Wrestling tournaments

References

External links
Big Japan Pro Wrestling official website
Death Match Survivor League Tournament History

Big Japan Pro Wrestling
Professional wrestling tournaments
Recurring events established in 2011